"Levitate" is a song written and recorded by the American musical duo Twenty One Pilots. The song was released as the third single from their fifth studio album Trench on August 8, 2018.

Composition 

"Levitate" is a rap rock song which also contains elements of hip hop and trap with psychedelic synths, electronic beats and fast-paced lyrics. It opens with the outro of the previous track on the album, "Jumpsuit". The song contains a reference to the lyrics of their song "Car Radio", where Tyler Joseph raps "I got back what I once bought, back in that slot I won't need to replace" in response to the chorus lyric from the 2013 song, "I ought to replace that slot with what I once bought, cause somebody stole my car radio and now I just sit in silence." The song was described by Rolling Stone as a "minimalist" track where "Joseph raps over warbled synths and Dun's primal pummel". He delivers a complex sequence of cascading rhyme schemes in quick succession metered to the up-tempo cadence of the track's beat in an insistent yet effortless manner that matches the propulsion of the pummeling rhythm. It has a tempo of 93 beats per minute and a duration of two minutes and twenty-five seconds.

Release 
The song was first leaked onto the music platform Tidal on August 7, 2018, only to be quickly removed. This was accompanied by a leaked track listing for the album. The song was subsequently released via Zane Lowe's Beats 1 show as the day's "World Record".

Music video 
The song's music video was released on August 8. The clip concludes the storyline from the two previous singles and was directed by Andrew Donoho, who directed videos for the previous Trench singles. The video shows Tyler Joseph having his head shaved and rapping the song in a torch-lit mountain retreat filled with the rebel "Banditos" before being grabbed by one of the bishops, the leaders of Dema.

Personnel
Credits adapted from the liner notes of Trench and Twenty One Pilots' official YouTube channel.
Twenty One Pilots
 Tyler Joseph  – lead vocals, bass, keyboards, synthesizers, sampling, programming, songwriting, production
 Josh Dun  –  drums, drum engineering, percussion, backing vocals
Additional personnel
 Paul Meany  – synthesizers, programming, songwriting, production, backing vocals
 Adam Hawkins  – mixing
 Chris Gehringer  – mastering

Charts

Weekly charts

Year-end charts

References 

2018 songs
2018 singles
Twenty One Pilots songs
Songs written by Tyler Joseph
Fueled by Ramen singles
Rap rock songs
Hip hop songs
Songs written by Paul Meany